The 2018 Missouri State Senate elections were held on November 6, 2018, to elect the seventeen Missouri State Senators to the Missouri State Senate. Half of the Senate's thirty-four seats are up for election every two years, with each Senator serving four-year terms. The next time that these seats were up was in the 2022 Missouri State Senate election.

Results Summary

Statewide

District
Results of the 2018 Missouri State Senate elections by district:

Close races
Districts where the margin of victory was under 10%:
District 8, 9.38%
District 30, 6.7%
District 34, 4.94%

District 2

Democratic Primary

Primary Results

Republican Primary

Primary Results

General Election

Results

District 4

Democratic Primary

Primary Results

Republican Primary

Primary Results

General Election

Results

District 6

Democratic Primary

Primary Results

Republican Primary

Primary Results

Libertarian Primary

Primary Results

General Election

Results

District 8

Democratic Primary

Primary Results

Republican Primary

Primary Results

General Election

Results

District 10

Democratic Primary

Primary Results

Republican Primary

Primary Results

General Election

Results

District 12

Democratic Primary

Primary Results

Republican Primary

Primary Results

General Election

Results

District 14

Democratic Primary

Primary Results

General Election

Results

District 16

Democratic Primary

Primary Results

Republican Primary

Primary Results

General Election

Results

District 18

Democratic Primary

Primary Results

Republican Primary

Primary Results

General Election

Results

District 20

Democratic Primary

Primary Results

Republican Primary

Primary Results

General Election

Results

District 22

Democratic Primary

Primary Results

Republican Primary

Primary Results

Libertarian Primary

Primary Results

General Election

Results

District 24

Democratic Primary

Primary Results

Republican Primary

Primary Results

Libertarian Primary

Primary Results

General Election

Results

District 26

Democratic Primary

Primary Results

Republican Primary

Primary Results

General Election

Results

District 28

Democratic Primary

Primary Results

Republican Primary

Primary Results

General Election

Results

District 30

Democratic Primary

Primary Results

Republican Primary

Primary Results

General Election

Results

District 32

Democratic Primary

Primary Results

Republican Primary

Primary Results

Green Primary

Primary Results

General Election

Results

District 34

Democratic Primary

Primary Results

Republican Primary

Primary Results

General Election

Results

References 

State senate
Missouri Senate elections
Missouri